The College of Science, Mathematics, and Technology (abbreviated as CSMT) was the science college of the former (1992-2015) University of Texas at Brownsville.  It consisted of six academic departments.  The six departments employ diverse faculty members - many of whom are leading experts in the fields - who have received funding from a variety of funding agencies, including the National Science Foundation, the National Institutes of Health, the Department of Education, and the Department of Defense, among others. The average  active ongoing external funding is about 25-30 million dollars.  In 2002 the Center for Gravitational Wave Astronomy (CGWA) research center was founded to help "develop excellence in research and education in areas related to gravitational wave astronomy."

CSMT had partnership agreements for scientific collaboration and students exchange with universities in Europe, Asia and Australia.As of 2012, the college hosted more than 1000 students enrolled in twenty-eight undergraduate and seven graduate programs. The programs offer a range of degree plans from certificates and associate degrees up to cooperative Ph.D. degrees with University of Texas at San Antonio. The college hosts annual national/international conferences and workshops in discrete geometry and gravitational waves among others.  In 2012, CSMT initiated its own cohort program and student advisory council.

Departments

Department of Biological Sciences
The Department of Biological Sciences at the University of Texas at Brownsville undertakes teaching, research, and community service.  The department offers courses that cover a range of biological topics at both the undergraduate and graduate levels.  Current research interests cover a broad range of taxonomic groups (e.g. all things aquatic) to a variety of ecosystems (e.g., coastal marine, subtropical, thorn scrub, and freshwater).

Bachelor's Degrees 
 Biology
 Biology – 8th-12th Grade Teaching

Graduate Degrees
 Master of Science in Biology
 Master of Science in Interdisciplinary Studies concentration in Biology

Department of Chemistry and Environmental Sciences 
The Department of Chemistry and Environmental Sciences at the University of Texas at Brownsville undertakes teaching and research. Current research projects include wetland restoration at the Bahia Grande Unit of Laguna Atascosa National Wildlife Refuge, artificial reef monitoring in the Gulf of Mexico, and the impacts of the US-Mexico border fence. Students work with organic molecules, assembling them at the thicknesses of a single molecule as well as nanotechnology. The department has also looked into the recent swine flu epidemic, and work on furthered understanding of how indigenous medicinal plants used in the US-Mexico Border region may be used in the treatment of diabetes.

Bachelor's Degrees 
 Chemistry
 Environmental Sciences
 Chemistry – 8th-12th Grade Teaching
 Environmental Sciences – 8th-12th Grade Teaching

Department of Computer and Information Sciences 
The Department of Computer and Information Sciences at the University of Texas at Brownsville undertakes teaching and research. The department offers undergraduate and postgraduate education. In 2010 CS program received ABET accreditation.

Certificates 
 Computer Information Technology
 Computer Web Development

Associate Degrees 
 Computer Information Systems
 Computer Science
 Computer Web Development

Bachelor's Degrees 
 Computer Science
 Computational Science
 Computer Information System Technology
 Computer Information System Technology Teaching

Graduate Degrees 
 Master of Science in Computer Science
 Master of Science in Interdisciplinary Studies concentration in Computer Science

Department of Engineering 
The department began in 1996 as Engineering Technology and became the Engineering Department in 2005. In 2010, the Engineering Physics program was accredited by the Engineering Accreditation Committee (EAC) of ABET. The Engineering Department strives to achieve the highest academic standards in research, teaching and service to the community.

Bachelor's Degrees 
 Engineering Physics - Bioengineering
 Engineering Physics - Computer
 Engineering Physics - Electrical
 Engineering Physics - Mechanical

Department of Mathematics 
The Department of Mathematics offers a Bachelor of Science degree as well as a Master of Science degree in Mathematics. The undergraduate curriculum prepares students for graduate studies, careers in applied mathematics, and teaching careers in mathematics. The graduate program provides students with knowledge in theoretical and applied mathematics as required by various disciplines in science and education.

Bachelor's Degrees 
 Mathematics
 Mathematics – 4th-8th Grade Teaching
 Mathematics – 8th- 12th Grade Teaching

Graduate Degree 
 Master of Science in Mathematics

Department of Physics & Astronomy 
The Department has 17 full-time faculty members actively engaged in research in the areas of Biophysics, Nanotechnology, Experimental Physics, Gravitational Wave Astronomy, Relativistic Astrophysics and Physics Education. The department places special emphasis on the involvement of students, at both the undergraduate and graduate levels, in research.

Bachelor's Degrees 
 Physics
 Physics - Biophysics Specialization
 Physics – 8th-12th Grade Teaching
 Science – 4th-8th Grade Teaching

Graduate Degrees 
 Master of Science in Physics
 Cooperative Ph.D. in Physics with University of Texas at San Antonio

CSMT Cohort Program 
Starting in fall 2012, first-time freshman majoring in Chemistry, Biology, Mathematics, or Engineering were eligible to join the CSMT Cohort Program.  A cohort is a group of students who follow the same set schedule and progress through an accelerated program together.  The program was created in order to create an interactive learning environment, facilitate networking opportunities, strengthen student relationships, and enhance the learning experience.

References

External links
 University of Texas at Brownsville Home Page
 College of Science Mathematics and Technology Home Page
 CSMT Biology Department
 CSMT Chemistry Department
 CSMT Computer Science Department
 CSMT Engineering Department
 CSMT Math Department
 CSMT Physics Department
 CSMT Engineering Technology Department

University of Texas at Brownsville
University of Texas Rio Grande Valley schools, colleges, and departments